Chad Dorsey Jones (born October 11, 1984), who used to go by the stage name Conviction, is an American rapper. He released an EP in 2014 with Reflection Music, Keep Up, and it was his breakthrough release on the Billboard charts.

Early life
Jones was born, Chad Dorsey Jones, on October 11, 1984, in Grand Rapids, Michigan. He resides in Memphis, Tennessee.

Music career
Chad Jones started making music in 2008 as Conviction, yet in 2014 started using his real name Chad Jones, releasing Keep Up EP with Reflection Music., and it charted on three Billboard charts.

Personal life
Chad Jones is married to Jeanine "Nene" Jones, and they have four children, residing in Memphis, Tennessee.

Discography

EPs

References

1984 births
Living people
African-American rappers
African-American Christians
Musicians from Michigan
Musicians from Tennessee
Performers of Christian hip hop music
Rappers from Michigan
Rappers from Tennessee
21st-century American rappers
21st-century African-American musicians
20th-century African-American people